Raja Sukh Jivan Mal was the ruler of Kashmir from 1754 to 1762. He rose from the rank of soldier to governor and then finally became the king. He was the first Hindu chief in Kashmir after a gap of 400 years

Early life 
Sukhjiwan Mal Sahni was born in Kabul, Afghanistan in a Punjabi Khatri family with origins from the city of Bhera, Punjab.

History

Background 
Kashmir under Afghan rulers was in a bad state. Locals were tortured and killed during the reign of Afghans. The very first Afghan chief Abdullah Khan Isk Aquasi appointed by Ahmad Shah Abdali would line up all Kashmiris whom he considered rich and would ask them to either part with their wealth or to face death. The Afghan army would often raid and loot common Kashmiri houses.

Rise 
After the loot and plunder, Abdullah Khan Isk Aquasi returned to Kabul leaving Kashmir under the charge of Abdullah Khan Kabuli. Kabuli appointed Sukh Jivan Mal as his chief advisor. A local leader of Kashmiri Muslims, Abdul Hassan Bandey wanted to get rid of the cruel Afghan rulers. Bandey convinced Sukh Jivan Mal to kill Kabuli and become independent. Subsequently, Kabuli was assassinated and Sukh Jivan Mal became the independent ruler after formally getting the title of "raja".

Reign 
As the ruler of Kashmir, Sukh Jivan appointed Bandey as his chief minister. As a retaliation, Ahmad Shah Abdali sent Khwaja Kijak and Abdullah Khan Isk Aquasi to Kashmir. They were both defeated. In another occasion, Afghan prisoners of war were paraded in the streets with Kashmiri crowds spitting at them. The locals of Kashmir were at large happy with the smooth and efficient administration but the happiness did not last very long. A destructive famine occurred in 1755 followed by locust attack. These natural calamities forced the locals to desperately eat dead locusts. Sukh Jiwan distributed 80 lakh kg rice for free among the poor people.

According to Schwartz, "Kashmir's only respite from economic and political pressures during the Afghan and Sikh rule occurred during the reign of Sukh Jivan Mal, marked by a flowering of literacy activity attached to patronage." Sukh Jiwan held weekly symposiums to which he invited all the poets. He also employed poets to produce history of Kashmir in the style of Book of Kings. Under the advice of Mohanand Dhar, Sukh Jiwan Mal in order to facilitate his work imported many Khatri Hindus from Punjab to Kashmir.

Defeat 
When force did not work, Abdali used wit to get control of Kashmir. He attempted to destroy the good relations between Sukh Jivan and Bandey by putting a wedge against them. Taking advantage of this situation, Abdali sent an army led by Nurud-din-Khan Bamzai to Kashmir. A major portion of Raja Sukh Jivan Mal's army including his commander-in-chief Bakth Mal betrayed him. Eventually, he was captured, blinded and sent to Abdali in Lahore where he was killed by throwing him under an elephant.

References 

Jivan Mal, Raja Sukh
Jivan Mal, Raja Sukh
Jivan Mal, Raja Sukh
Jivan Mal, Raja Sukh
Jivan Mal, Raja Sukh